Kimberly Brady is a fictional character on the television soap opera, Days of Our Lives. Originated by Patsy Pease in July 1984, she is most recognizable for the role. Her initial run lasted until March 1990, but she returned twice from 1991 to 1992, with Anne Marie Howard portraying Kim in the interims. Ariana Chase played the role from December 1992 to June 1993 . Pease returned to the role in 1994, and continued to make appearances until 2016. Casey Wallace played Kimberly in flashback sequences in 1992.

Casting
Patsy Pease originated the role of Shawn and Caroline Brady's eldest daughter on July 24, 1984, remaining until her first departure on March 12, 1990, when Anne Marie Howard stepped in temporarily from March 13 to August 13, 1990, and again briefly from July 17 to August 14, 1991. Pease returned for stints from December 21, 1991 to January 22, 1992, and July 14 to December 22, 1992, until Ariana Chase took over full-time from December 29, 1992, to June 25, 1993. Pease again returned to the role of Kim (and has remained the character's only portrayer since) with stints lasting from June 28 to July 4, 1994, November 1 to 15, 1996, April 16 to 30, 1997, October 28, 1997, to September 23, 1998, May 30 to June 3, 2002, November 20, 2003, to January 16, 2004, February 27 and 28, 2008, June 24 to July 5, 2010, November 18 to 20, 2013, December 2014, and May 22 to 29, 2015. She last appeared on November 28, 2016. Casey Wallace played the character for newly created flashbacks in 1992.

Storylines
The second-born child of Shawn and Caroline Brady, Kimberly returns to Salem in 1984 after leaving five years earlier for reasons that were unclear to the rest of the Brady family. It was revealed that Kim has been working in Europe as a high class prostitute and sometimes photographer after fleeing Salem to escape years of sexual abuse by her uncle, Eric (Shawn's brother). Shane Donovan was assigned by the ISA to spy on Kimberly as she had incidentally taken photographs of Stefano DiMera's secret island in the Caribbean. Shane invited Kim to go to England to Donovan Manor where they declared their love for one another, during which time, Kim began to experience attacks of temporary blindness. While in England, they were shocked to find Shane's supposedly dead wife, Emma, alive. She had been brainwashed by the Dragon to kill Bo and Hope. Return to Salem alone to get on with her life, Kimberly soon goes blind.

Shane and Emma arrive in Salem, and Shane is shocked to learn Kim is blind. He once again declares his love for her, but Kim backs away from the now-married Shane. Victor Kiriakis befriends Kimberly, though Caroline does not approve as she is afraid that Victor has ulterior motives. Kimberly receives news from Neil Curtis that the disease that caused her blindness is in remission. Still being blind however, Neil explains the cause is now emotional. Devastating Kimberly, Victor uses this to his advantage, inviting Kim to live with him which greatly angers Shane, as he is now investigating Victor for the ISA. Once Kim regains her eyesight, she realises Victor is heavily involved in crime and agrees to help Shane bring him down, resuming their relationship.

In 1985, Kimberly came into possession of a roll of film that contained some prints to the location of a treasure that Victor and Stefano were after, which again would come into play years down the road. In Miami, Bo, Hope, Kim and Shane were all out to destroy Victor's plan. Shane had been imprisoned by Victor, but Kimberly slept with Victor in order to spare Shane's life. Shane escaped, and managed to free Bo and Hope who were trapped with an explosive that was meant to kill them. Later Victor, Savannah Wilder, and Steve Johnson were arrested for their crime. They were all freed when Victor blackmailed Larry Welch into taking the fall for everything. Victor knew Larry killed Megan and used it against him.

In 1986 Kimberly hid the fact that she thought her child was Victor's. It was also at this time that Kim discovered that her mother Caroline Brady had an affair with Victor years earlier and thought that Victor may be her biological father. However it was later revealed that Bo was Victor's son. One day Shane heard Kimberly talking about her fears and quickly broke off their engagement. Later when tests were done to determine the father, Emma Donovan Marshall switched the results, so everyone believed that Victor was the father. During a trip to West Virginia, in hopes of reuniting, Kimberly went into labor in a remote cabin in the woods. Shane delivered the baby, and he pledged his love for Kimberly and the child. They planned to marry even though they believed Victor was Andrew's father. The news infuriated Emma, who tricked Kimberly into signing adoption papers.

See also
 Supercouple

References

External links
 Kimberly Brady at soapcentral.com

Days of Our Lives characters
Fictional photographers
Fictional prostitutes
Television characters introduced in 1984
American female characters in television
Fictional victims of sexual assault
Fictional victims of child sexual abuse
Fictional characters with dissociative identity disorder
Brady family (Days of Our Lives)